Connor McIntyre (born 30 November 1960) is an English actor, best known for playing Pat Phelan in the ITV soap opera, Coronation Street from 2013 to 2014 and again from 2016 to 2018,  but has also had large roles in TV shows such as Always and Everyone, The Jury, Buried, Murder City, Outlaws, Drop Dead Gorgeous and The Case.

Career
McIntyre began acting when he joined the Barbican Theatre in Plymouth. He has appeared in numerous television shows, including The Bill, Casualty, Heartbeat, Law & Order: UK and Doctors. His film roles include The Be All and End All and Charlie Noads R.I.P while his stage work includes appearances in The Comedy of Errors, One for the Road and Harry's Christmas.

Filmography

Television

Film

Guest appearances
Lorraine (2014, 2016, 2017, 2018)
This Morning (2016, 2017, 2020)
Good Morning Britain (2017)
Saturday Mash-Up! (2018)

Awards and nominations

References

External links

1960 births
Living people
Male actors from Liverpool
English male soap opera actors
English male film actors
English male stage actors